There are 3,820 lakes in New Zealand that have a surface area larger than one hectare. Many of the lakes in the central North Island are volcanic crater lakes. The majority of the lakes near the Southern Alps / Kā Tiritiri o te Moana were carved by glaciers. Artificial lakes created as hydroelectric reservoirs are common in South Canterbury, Central Otago and along the Waikato River.

Statistics

Largest lake: Lake Taupō – 
Deepest lake: Lake Hauroko – 462 m

There are:
41 lakes with a surface area larger than 10 km2 (1000 ha)
229 lakes greater than 0.5 km2 (50 ha)
3820 lakes greater than 0.01 km2 (1 ha)

Pollution
A trophic level index is used as a measure of the pollution levels of lakes in New Zealand.

Based on the monitoring of 134 lakes it is estimated that one third of New Zealand lakes have high nutrient levels or have poor water quality.

See also

Rivers of New Zealand
Water in New Zealand
List of dams and reservoirs in New Zealand
Environment of New Zealand

References

Further reading

External links
Lake Ecosystem Restoration New Zealand